Juutilainen is a Finnish surname. The name mainly comes from the Savonia province, but originally it is from the word "juutti", which refers to the Jutes from Jutland. Notable people with the surname include:

Antti Juutilainen (1882-1951), Finnish farmer and politician.
Aarne Juutilainen (1904–1976), army captain
Ilmari Juutilainen (1914–1999), Air Force fighter pilot
Pekka Juutilainen (born 1940), Finnish middle-distance runner
Anssi Juutilainen, (born 1956) Finnish ski-orienteering competitor and world champion
Virpi Juutilainen (born 1961), Finnish ski-orienteering competitor and world champion
Jan-Mikael Juutilainen (born 1988), Finnish ice hockey player

Fictional characters
Eila Ilmatar Juutilainen, a fictional character from the anime/manga series Strike Witches

References

Finnish-language surnames